The Mammoth Book of Extreme Science Fiction  is a science fiction anthology edited by Mike Ashley, originally published in 2006 in the United Kingdom by Robinson, an imprint of Constable & Robinson Ltd. It was reprinted in the United States, also in 2006, by Carroll & Graf, and imprint of Avalon Publishing Group. It is one of a long series of "Mammoth Book" short story collections edited by Ashley and published by Robinson, most of which have themes outside of science fiction.

Contents

The book includes 19 science fiction short stories, along with a two-page introduction entitled "Extreme Science Fiction" by Mike Ashley, on the theme of the anthology. The stories were originally published from 1909, for "The New Humans" by B. Vallance, to 2003, plus three stories that are published for the first time in this book. One author is represented twice in the collection: Jerry Oltion. The stories are as follows, along with their dates of original publication.

Gregory Benford: "Anomalies" (1999)
Paul Di Filippo: "...And The Dish Ran Away With The Spoon" (2003)
Lawrence Person: "Crucifixion Variations" (1998)
Stephen Baxter: "The Pacific Mystery" (2006, original to this book)
Cory Doctorow & Charles Stross: "Flowers From Alice" (2003)
Alastair Reynolds: "Merlin's Gun" (2000)
Pat Cadigan: "Death In The Promised Land" (1995)
Geoffrey A. Landis: "The Long Chase" (2002)
Stephen L. Gillett & Jerry Oltion: "Waterworld" (1994)
Robert Reed: "Hoop of Benzene" (2006, original to this book)
B. Vallance: "The New Humans" (1909)
Clifford D. Simak: "The Creator" (1935)
Theodore Sturgeon: "The Girl Had Guts" (1957)
Harlan Ellison: "The Region Between" (1969)
Ian McDonald: "The Days Of Solomon Gursky" (1998)
Greg Egan: "Wang's Carpets" (1995)
James Patrick Kelly: "Undone" (2001)
Greg Bear: "Judgment Engine" (1995)
Jerry Oltion: "Stuffing" (2006, original to this book)

2006 anthologies
Science fiction anthologies
Constable & Robinson books